Mount Carmel is an unincorporated community in Fleming County, Kentucky, in the United States.

History
Mount Carmel was incorporated in 1825. A post office was established at Mount Carmel in 1829, and remained in operation until it was discontinued in 1932.

References

Unincorporated communities in Fleming County, Kentucky
Unincorporated communities in Kentucky